Sir Adolphe-Basile Routhier  (May 8, 1839 – June 27, 1920) was a Canadian judge, author, and lyricist. He wrote the lyrics of the original French version of the Canadian national anthem "O Canada". He was born in Saint-Placide, Quebec, to Charles Routhier and Angélique Lafleur.

Early life and education

Routhier was born and grew up in Saint-Placide, Quebec, on his family's farm. He attended Séminaire de Ste-Thérèse, and later studied law at Université Laval.  He graduated and was called to the Quebec bar in 1861.

Career
Routhier practised law in Kamouraska until he was appointed to the Quebec Superior Court in 1873 (as Chief Justice from 1904 to 1906) and Admiralty of the Exchequer Court of Canada (from 1897 to 1906).

Routhier ran as a Conservative candidate for the riding of Kamouraska in several federal elections, but he was never elected.  

Routhier wrote a number of books under the name Jean Piquefort.

Routhier's poem "Ô Canada" was commissioned by the Lieutenant Governor of Quebec Théodore Robitaille for the 1880 Saint-Jean-Baptiste Day ceremony.

In June 1914, Routhier was one of the three judges appointed to conduct the Commission of Inquiry into the sinking of the Canadian Pacific steamship , which had resulted in the loss of 1,012 lives.

Personal

Routhier married Clorinde Mondelet on November 12, 1862, in Quebec and had one son.

Honours
Many sites and landmarks were named to honour Basile Routhier. They include:

Rue Basile-Routhier (Basile-Routhier Street), located in Shawinigan, Quebec, Canada;
Place Basile-Routhier, located in Shawinigan;
Rue Basile-Routhier in Montreal, Quebec;
Boulevard Basile-Routhier in Repentigny, Quebec.
Avenue Sir Adolphe Routhier in Quebec City, Quebec, Canada;

Selected publications
Les Echos, P. G. Delisle, 1882.

References

External links
 
 

1839 births
1920 deaths
Canadian songwriters
Songwriters from Quebec
National anthem writers
Judges in Quebec
Canadian Knights Bachelor
Persons of National Historic Significance (Canada)
Judges of the Exchequer Court of Canada
Fellows of the Royal Society of Canada
Université Laval alumni
Academic staff of Université Laval